This list shows the IUCN Red List status of the 150 wild mammal fauna of Turkey. Two are critically endangered, two are endangered, fourteen are vulnerable, and three are near threatened. The following tags are used to highlight each species' global status as published by the International Union for Conservation of Nature:

Order: Rodentia (rodents) 

Rodents make up the largest order of mammals with over 40% of mammalian species. They have two incisors in the upper and lower jaw, which grow continually and are kept short by gnawing.
Suborder: Hystricognathi
Family: Hystricidae (Old World porcupines)
Genus: Hystrix
Indian crested porcupine, H. indica 
Suborder: Sciurognathi
Family: Sciuridae (squirrels)
Subfamily: Sciurinae
Tribe: Sciurini
Genus: Sciurus
 Caucasian squirrel, S. anomalus 
 Eurasian red squirrel, S. vulgaris 
Subfamily: Xerinae
Genus: Spermophilus
 European ground squirrel, S. citellus EN
 Asia Minor ground squirrel, Spermophilus xanthoprymnus NT
 Taurus ground squirrel, Spermophilus taurensis
Family: Cricetidae
Subfamily: Cricetinae
Genus: Cricetulus
 Grey dwarf hamster, C. migratorius 
Genus: Cricetus
European hamster, C. cricetus 
Genus: Mesocricetus
 Golden hamster, Mesocricetus auratus VU
 Turkish hamster, Mesocricetus brandti NT
Subfamily: Arvicolinae
Genus: Arvicola
European water vole, A. amphibius 
Genus: Chionomys
 Caucasian snow vole, Chionomys gud LC
 European snow vole, Chionomys nivalis LC
 Robert's snow vole, Chionomys roberti LC
Genus: Clethrionomys
 Bank vole, Clethrionomys glareolus LC
Genus: Ellobius
 Transcaucasian mole vole, Ellobius lutescens LC
Genus: Microtus
 Common vole, Microtus arvalis LC
 Günther's vole, Microtus guentheri LC
 Persian vole, Microtus irani LC
 Southern vole, Microtus rossiaemeridionalis LC
 Social vole, Microtus socialis LC
 European pine vole, Microtus subterraneus LC
Genus: Prometheomys
 Long-clawed mole vole, Prometheomys schaposchnikowi LC
Family: Gliridae (dormice)
Subfamily: Leithiinae
Genus: Dryomys
 Woolly dormouse, Dryomys laniger DD
 Forest dormouse, Dryomys nitedula LC
Genus: Eliomys
Asian garden dormouse, E. melanurus 
Genus: Muscardinus
 Hazel dormouse, Muscardinus avellanarius LC
Genus: Myomimus
 Roach's mouse-tailed dormouse, Myomimus roachi VU
Subfamily: Glirinae
Genus: Glis
 European edible dormouse, Glis glis LC
Family: Dipodidae (jerboas)
Subfamily: Allactaginae
Genus: Allactaga
 Small five-toed jerboa, Allactaga elater LC
 Euphrates jerboa, Allactaga euphratica NT
Family: Spalacidae
Subfamily: Spalacinae
Genus: Nannospalax
 Palestine mole rat, Nannospalax ehrenbergi LC
 Lesser mole rat, Nannospalax leucodon DD
 Nehring's blind mole-rat, Nannospalax nehringi LC
Family: Muridae (mice, rats, voles, gerbils, hamsters)
Subfamily: Deomyinae
Genus: Acomys
 Asia Minor spiny mouse, Acomys cilicicus DD
Subfamily: Gerbillinae
Genus: Meriones
 Persian jird, Meriones persicus LC
 Tristram's jird, Meriones tristrami LC
 Vinogradov's jird, Meriones vinogradovi LC
Subfamily: Murinae
Genus: Apodemus
 Striped field mouse, Apodemus agrarius LC
 Yellow-necked mouse, Apodemus flavicollis LC
 Yellow-breasted field mouse, Apodemus fulvipectus LC
 Black Sea field mouse, Apodemus ponticus LC
 Wood mouse, Apodemus sylvaticus LC
 Ural field mouse, Apodemus uralensis LC
Genus: Micromys
 Eurasian harvest mouse, Micromys minutus LC
Genus: Mus
 Macedonian mouse, Mus macedonicus LC
House mouse, M. musculus

Order: Lagomorpha (rabbits, hares and picas) 
Family: Leporidae
Genus: Lepus
 European hare, L. europaeus

Order: Erinaceomorpha (hedgehogs and gymnures) 

The order Erinaceomorpha contains a single family, Erinaceidae, which comprise the hedgehogs and gymnures. The hedgehogs are easily recognised by their spines while gymnures look more like large rats.

Family: Erinaceidae (hedgehogs)
Subfamily: Erinaceinae
Genus: Erinaceus
 Southern white-breasted hedgehog, E. concolor 
Genus: Hemiechinus
 Long-eared hedgehog, H. auritus

Order: Soricomorpha (shrews, moles, and solenodons) 

The "shrew-forms" are insectivorous mammals. The shrews and solenodons closely resemble mice while the moles are stout-bodied burrowers.
Family: Soricidae (shrews)
Subfamily: Crocidurinae
Genus: Crocidura
 Gueldenstaedt's shrew, C. gueldenstaedtii 
 Bicolored shrew, C. leucodon 
 Serezkaya shrew, C. serezkyensis 
Lesser white-toothed shrew, C. suaveolens 
Genus: Suncus
 Etruscan shrew, S. etruscus 
Subfamily: Soricinae
Tribe: Nectogalini
Genus: Neomys
 Southern water shrew, N. anomalus 
 Eurasian water shrew, N. fodiens 
 Transcaucasian water shrew, N. schelkovnikovi 
Tribe: Soricini
Genus: Sorex
 Common shrew, S. araneus 
 Eurasian pygmy shrew, S. minutus 
 Radde's shrew, S. raddei 
 Caucasian shrew, S. satunini 
 Caucasian pygmy shrew, S. volnuchini 
Family: Talpidae (moles)
Subfamily: Talpinae
Tribe: Talpini
Genus: Talpa
 European mole, T. europaea 
 Levantine mole, T. levantis

Order: Chiroptera (bats) 

The bats' distinguishing feature is that their forelimbs are developed as wings, making them the only mammals capable of flight. Bat species account for about 20% of all mammals.
Family: Pteropodidae (flying foxes, Old World fruit bats)
Subfamily: Pteropodinae
Genus: Rousettus
 Egyptian fruit bat, R. aegyptiacus 
Family: Vespertilionidae
Subfamily: Myotinae
Genus: Myotis
Bechstein's bat, M. bechsteini 
Greater mouse-eared bat, M. myotis 
Brandt's bat, M. brandti 
Long-fingered bat, M. capaccinii 
Daubenton's bat, M. daubentonii 
Geoffroy's bat, M. emarginatus 
Whiskered bat, M. mystacinus 
Natterer's bat, M. nattereri 
Subfamily: Vespertilioninae
Genus: Barbastella
Western barbastelle, B. barbastellus 
Genus: Eptesicus
Botta's serotine, Eptesicus bottae 
Northern bat, E. nilssoni 
Serotine bat, E. serotinus 
Genus: Hypsugo
Savi's pipistrelle, H. savii 
Genus: Nyctalus
Greater noctule bat, N. lasiopterus 
Lesser noctule, N. leisleri 
Common noctule, N. noctula 
Genus: Pipistrellus
Kuhl's pipistrelle, P. kuhlii 
Nathusius' pipistrelle, P. nathusii 
Common pipistrelle, P. pipistrellus 
Genus: Plecotus
Brown long-eared bat, P. auritus 
Grey long-eared bat, P. austriacus 
Genus: Vespertilio
Parti-coloured bat, V. murinus 
Subfamily: Miniopterinae
Genus: Miniopterus
Common bent-wing bat, M. schreibersii 
Family: Molossidae
Genus: Tadarida
European free-tailed bat, T. teniotis 
Family: Emballonuridae
Genus: Taphozous
Naked-rumped tomb bat, T. nudiventris 
Family: Rhinolophidae
Subfamily: Rhinolophinae
Genus: Rhinolophus
Blasius's horseshoe bat, R. blasii 
Mediterranean horseshoe bat, R. euryale 
Greater horseshoe bat, R. ferrumequinum 
Lesser horseshoe bat, R. hipposideros 
Mehely's horseshoe bat, R. mehelyi

Order: Cetacea (whales, dolphins, and porpoises) 

The order Cetacea includes whales, dolphins and porpoises. They are the mammals most fully adapted to aquatic life with a spindle-shaped nearly hairless body, protected by a thick layer of blubber, and forelimbs and tail modified to provide propulsion underwater.

Species listed below also includes species being recorded in Levantine Sea.
Suborder: Mysticeti
Family: Balaenopteridae
Genus: Balaenoptera
Common minke whale, B. acutorostrata 
Fin whale, B. physalus  
Subfamily: Megapterinae
Genus: Megaptera
Humpback whale, M. novaeangliae 
Suborder: Odontoceti
Family: Physeteridae (sperm whales)
Genus: Physeter
Sperm whale, P. macrocephalus 
Family: Ziphidae
Genus: Ziphius
 Cuvier's beaked whale, Z. cavirostris 
Superfamily: Platanistoidea
Family: Phocoenidae
Genus: Phocoena
 Harbour porpoise, P. phocoena 
Family: Delphinidae (marine dolphins)
Genus: Tursiops
 Common bottlenose dolphin, T. truncatus 
Genus: Delphinus
 Short-beaked common dolphin, D. delphis 
Genus: Stenella
 Striped dolphin, S. coeruleoalba 
Genus: Grampus
 Risso's dolphin, G. griseus 
Genus: Orcinus
 Orca, O. orca 
Genus: Pseudorca
 False killer whale, P. crassidens 
Genus: Globicephala
Long-finned pilot whale, G. melas

Order: Carnivora (carnivorans) 

There are over 260 species of carnivorans, the majority of which feed primarily on meat. They have a characteristic skull shape and dentition. 
Suborder: Feliformia
Family: Felidae (cats)
Subfamily: Felinae
Genus: Caracal
 Caracal, C. caracal 
Genus: Felis
Jungle cat, F. chaus 
 African wildcat, F. lybica 
Asiatic wildcat, F. l. ornata
 European wildcat, F. silvestris 
 Caucasian wildcat, F. s. caucasica
Genus: Lynx
 Eurasian lynx, L. lynx 
Caucasian lynx, L. l. dinniki
Subfamily: Pantherinae
Genus: Panthera
Leopard, P. pardus 
 P. p. tulliana,  
Family: Herpestidae (mongooses)
Genus: Herpestes
Egyptian mongoose, H. ichneumon 
Genus: Urva
Indian grey mongoose, U. edwardsii 
Family: Hyaenidae (hyaenas)
Genus: Hyaena
Striped hyena, H. hyaena 
Suborder: Caniformia
Family: Canidae (dogs, foxes)
Genus: Canis
Golden jackal, C. aureus 
European jackal, C. a. moreoticus
 Gray wolf, C. lupus 
Steppe wolf, C. l. campestris
Indian wolf, C. l. pallipes
Genus: Vulpes
Red fox, V. vulpes 
Family: Ursidae (bears)
Genus: Ursus
Brown bear, U. arctos 
Family: Mustelidae (mustelids)
Genus: Lutra
European otter, L. lutra 
Genus: Martes
Beech marten, M. foina 
European pine marten, M. martes 
Genus: Meles
Caucasian badger, M. canescens 
Genus: Mustela
Stoat, M. erminea 
Least weasel, M. nivalis 
European polecat, M. putorius 
Genus: Vormela
Marbled polecat, V. peregusna 
Family: Phocidae (earless seals)
Genus: Monachus
Mediterranean monk seal, M. monachus

Order: Artiodactyla (even-toed ungulates) 
Even-toed ungulates' weight is borne about equally by the third and fourth toes, rather than mostly or entirely by the third as in perissodactyls. There are about 220 artiodactyl species, including many that are of great economic importance to humans.
Family: Bovidae
Subfamily: Antilopinae
Genus: Gazella
Mountain gazelle, G. gazella 
Arabian sand gazelle, G. marica  reintroduced
Goitered gazelle, G. subgutturosa 
Subfamily: Caprinae
Genus: Capra
Wild goat, C. aegagrus 
Genus: Ovis
 Mouflon, O. gmelini 
Genus: Rupicapra
 Chamois, R. rupicapra 
Family: Cervidae (deer)
Subfamily: Cervinae
Genus: Cervus
Red deer, C. elaphus 
Genus: Dama
European fallow deer, D. dama 
Subfamily: Capreolinae
Genus: Capreolus
 Roe deer, C. capreolus 
Family: Suidae
Subfamily: Suinae
Genus: Sus
Wild boar, S. scrofa

Locally extinct 
The following species are locally extinct in Turkey:
Eurasian beaver, Castor fiber
Persian fallow deer, Dama mesopotamica
Onager, Equus hemionus
Lion, Panthera leo
Tiger, Panthera tigris

See also
Wildlife of Turkey
List of chordate orders
Lists of mammals by region
Mammal classification
Mammal Species of the World

References

External links
National Biodiversity Database

 
Mammals
Turkey
Turkey
Turkey